Larry Lynch (born c. 1950) is a former drummer for the Greg Kihn Band. They had a #2 US hit with "Jeopardy" in 1983 and a #15 hit with "The Breakup Song (They Don't Write 'Em)". After leaving the Greg Kihn band, "Larry Lynch and MOB (Members Of the Band)", gigged throughout the East San Francisco Bay area, teaming up with Robbie Dunbar, the guitarist from San Francisco's "Earthquake".

Lynch's vocals and songwriting were a staple of many smaller venues such as New George's in San Rafael. MOB headlined for Radio Station KZAP's Halloween extravaganza at the Sacramento Convention Center in 1987, which drew thousands of fans and provided a brief boost for his solo effort.

Lynch resides in the East Bay area.  He is the father of two adult sons and one daughter.  He continues to play and write.

His current band is "Larry Lynch and The Mob".

References

1950 births
Living people
People from El Cerrito, California
American rock drummers
Place of birth missing (living people)
The Greg Kihn Band members
20th-century American drummers
American male drummers
20th-century American male musicians